aiScaler Ltd. is a multinational software company founded in 2008. It develops application delivery controllers designed to allow dynamic web pages to scale content by intelligently caching frequently requested content. A number of websites in the Alexa top 1000 use aiScaler to manage their traffic.

aiScaler software can be deployed either on public cloud computing platforms such as Amazon Web Services or private virtual environments. aiScaler software is considered an edge device as it proxies traffic, augmenting or replacing content delivery networks endpoints.

History
aiScaler started as a project in 1994 by the web development company WBS. The project was called "Jxel", short for Java Accelerator. The technology was Java-based and intended to be run on a Java Virtual Machine sharing the same computer system as the HTTP server. It was re-written in 2009 using the C computer language, occupying its own dedicated server. The new software was rewritten to run on Linux only, taking advantage of changes in the input/output model based on epoll. In July 2008, aiScaler Ltd acquired all technology of WBS for $3.8 million.

Until 2013, aiScaler was known as "aiCache", producing a product called aiScaler. The company took over the name of its main product, phasing out the brand name aiCache.

Products
All aiScaler products can be categorized as Application Delivery Controllers
aiScaler is an HTTP accelerator that provides application delivery control, in addition to scaling and acceleration of content delivery 
aiProtect offers protection against DDoS attacks and SQL injections
aiMobile is a Mobile content management system 
aiCDN is a cloud-based Application Delivery Network that allows scaling of dynamic web applications.
aiScaler and Dell offer a hardware Application Delivery Controller, which fits in a standard rack unit server rack.

aiScaler is based on epoll technology allowing it to employ a right-threaded (only the specified number of workers process requests, no matter how many clients are connected), non-blocking, multiplexed IO design.

References

External links
 Official development web site
 "aiCache Deployment CNBC", June 9, 2009 Highscalability.com article by Director of Platforms CNBC Rashid Karimov describing the implementation of the aicache software as an edge device.

Network performance
Internet architecture
Servers (computing)
Routing